John Fitzgerald and Anders Järryd were the defending champions but only Järryd competed that year with Jakob Hlasek.

Hlasek and Järryd won the final 6–3 after Jim Grabb and Patrick McEnroe were forced to retire.

Seeds

Draw

Finals

Top half

Section 1

Section 2

Bottom half

Section 3

Section 4

External links
1989 Lipton International Players Championships Doubles Draw

Men's Doubles